Byron Goodwin (born 4 September 1972) is a Canadian retired athlete who competed in the 400 and 800 metres. He represented his country in the 4 × 400 metres relay at the 1999 World Championships. Additionally, he holds the Canadian record in the rarely contested indoor 600 metres.

Competition record

Personal bests

Outdoor
400 metres – 46.15 (Victoria 1994)
800 metres – 1:47.33 (Melbourne 1996)
Indoor
600 metres – 1:16.10 (Winnipeg 1995) NR
800 metres – 1:50.47 (Minneapolis 1997)

References

1972 births
Living people
Canadian male sprinters
Canadian male middle-distance runners
Commonwealth Games competitors for Canada
Athletes (track and field) at the 1994 Commonwealth Games
Athletes (track and field) at the 1995 Pan American Games
Athletes (track and field) at the 1999 Pan American Games
Pan American Games track and field athletes for Canada